The Nigerian National Assembly delegation from Katsina comprises three Senators representing Katsina South, Katsina Central, and Katsina North, and fifteen Representatives representing Kaita/Jibia, Malum Fashi/Kafur, Daura/Sandamu/Mai'Adua, Funtua/Dandume, Dutsin-ma/Kurfi, Mashi/Dutsi, Mani/Bindawa, Bakori/Danja, Kankia/Ingawa/Kusada, Safana/Batsari/Dan-Musa, Musawa/Matazu, Rimi/Charanchi/Batagarawa, Baure/Zango, Kankara/Sabuwa/Faskari, and Katsina Central.

Nigerian Fourth Republic|Fourth Republic

The 4th Parliament (1999–2019)

References
Official Website - National Assembly House of Representatives (Katsina State)
 Senator List
Senator Ibraim M. Ida's Website

Politics of Katsina State
National Assembly (Nigeria) delegations by state